Joyride is an Irish-British coming-of-age comedy film directed by Emer Reynolds from a screenplay by Ailbhe Keogan. It had its world premiere at the Galway Film Fleadh on 5 July 2022 and was released on 29 July 2022, by Vertigo Releasing.

Plot
Set in County Kerry, Ireland, this road movie is centred on 13-year-old Mully who's just lost his mother, and Joy, a solicitor, and her newborn baby.

Mully's mother Rita has just died of cancer, and he confronts his thieving father James who has just pinched the cancer hospice money from the collection jar at her celebration of life gathering at the pub. His dad insists she would have wanted him to have it, to use to pay for his own debts. The boy grabs the cash and drives off in a taxi, planning to give it back. Suddenly he realises there are passengers in the back seat.

Joy, clearly overwhelmed by her needy newborn, seeing Mully's ease at caring for her child (he'd been helping care for a baby sibling at home), proposes they travel together. They swap the taxi for a car in a used car lot.

Joy and Mully take the backroads to remain undetected as he is an unlicensed driver, and they could be stopped by the law. As this odd couple travels, they bond, quarrelling and then developing a sort of mother-son dynamic. Mully accidentally hits a fox, and then Joy has to run it over to put it out of its misery.

The car runs out of fuel. As they walk to get more petrol, Mully proposes they take turns asking and answering questions. When queried, he explains about the hospice money, and Joy shares her plans to give up the baby to her friend Max and then fly to Lanzarote, as she hasn't bonded with the baby and doesn't know who the father is.
 
Calling James from the petrol station, Mully is convinced by his father to head for a ferry, which Joy initially rejects. However, when a police checkpoint goes wrong, she changes her mind about the ferry, swapping for another car.

While waiting for the next ferry, Mully even helps Joy learn how to breastfeed Robin (she thought up the name upon seeing a robin alight nearby), as he observed with his infant sibling. She tells him she and his mother were in the same class at school, Joy one of the brightest and Rita extremely beautiful.

Mully’s dad catches up with them, and Mully convinces him to let Joy and Robin go with them in the car. They go to a B&B when Joy haemorrhages, so she can get cleaned up and rest. In the meantime, his father has thought up a lie, wanting Mully to lie to them at the pub, saying he stole the money then got robbed.

Joy calls up her childhood friend Max, letting her know she had the baby one week early, her name's Robin and she's breastfed her. She then tells her about a repressed memory from her childhood. One day, she and her mother saw her dad cheating; afterwards, Joy had gone into the sea. When the undertone started to get her, she saw her mother hesitate to save her. Joy tells Max she'll be there soon.

The next morning, before leaving, Joy gives the hospice money back to Mully so he can do the right thing. Hurt she's leaving him and going through with giving away Robin, he lashes out, insulting her. In a daze and with an emotional crisis, she drops Robin off on Max's doorstep, then drives on to Kerry airport in deep denial about her own nascent feelings.

No sooner does Joy board the Spain-bound plane than she has a change of heart. Insisting they let her off, she races back to find Mully. Locating him, he initially tells her off, but James appears demanding the money. Joy tries to protect Mully from his father, but he races to the water, throwing the cash over his shoulder. His father retrieves the cash, while she fishes him out of the water.

The film ends with Max calling Joy to pick up a distraught Robin, and she drives by the pub with Mully to return the stolen money and then to collect the baby.

Cast

Production
In November 2020, it was reported that Olivia Colman would star in Joyride, which would be directed by Emer Reynolds from a script by Ailbhe Keogan. In June 2021, Charlie Reid was cast in the film after a casting search involving "1,500 applicants". As of 17 July 2021, Colman was spotted shooting scenes for the film in Kerry, Ireland.

Release
In June 2021, Vertigo Releasing acquired U.K. and Irish rights to the film. It had its world premiere at the Galway Film Fleadh on 5 July 2022. It was released on 29 July 2022. Magnolia Pictures announced that they acquired the U.S. distribution rights and will release the film in U.S. theaters and on demand December 23, 2022.

References

External links
 

2020s British films
2020s coming-of-age comedy films
2020s English-language films
British coming-of-age comedy films
English-language Irish films
Films shot in County Kerry
Irish coming-of-age comedy films